Syed Muhammad Hashmi Miyan (Urdu سید محمد ہاشمی میاں) is an Indian Sunni Sufi Muslim scholar and preacher. He is recognised as Ghazi e Millat (warrior of the community). He is followed by many Hindi and Urdu speakers, and is recognised as the member of 40th generation of the Islamic prophet, Muhammad.

According to one British website Hashmi Miyan is the youngest son of Muhaddis e Azam e Hind.

He is the younger brother of Madani Miya.

Views 
He had opposed the Citizenship Amendment Act, quoting 
that it is fine to eliminate the illegal immigrants  from India, but it is quite difficult for all the Indian citizens to prove their residence-ship in India. He believes that there is no religion of terrorism.

Literary works
Hashmi Miyan's literary works include
Lataif e Deoband
Rusumaat o Moharram o Taaziya
Hazrat Amir e Muawiya Khalifa-e-Rashid
Khutbaat e Hashmi Miyan

References

Living people
Sufism
Indian religious leaders
1947 births
Indian Muslims